Here is the full list of colleges in Chittagong, Bangladesh.

 
Bangladesh education-related lists
Chittagong-related lists